Virginia Bar can refer to either the

 Virginia Bar Association, a voluntary organization of lawyers, judges and law school faculty and students in Virginia
 Virginia State Bar, the administrative agency of the Supreme Court of Virginia